Twinkle Star High School is an elementary and high school in Mahabubabad, Telangana, India.  Established in 1991, it serves students from kindergarten through tenth standard.  Twinkle Star provides residential facilities for 200 boarding students.

See also
Education in India
List of schools in India
List of institutions of higher education in Telangana

References

External links
 
 Twinkle Star High School, Mahabubabad at schoolsworld.in

Boarding schools in Telangana
High schools and secondary schools in Telangana
Hanamkonda district
1991 establishments in Andhra Pradesh
Educational institutions established in 1991